The 2016 Dresden Cup was a summer football friendly tournament organized by German club Dynamo Dresden and Match IQ. It was hosted at the Stadion Dresden in Dresden, from 29 to 30 July 2016. Besides the hosts, three other European teams took part: Everton (England), Real Betis (Spain), and Werder Bremen (Germany). Betis' participation was also a part of their LFP World Challenge campaign.

Overview

Participants

Standings
Each team played two matches, with three points awarded for a win and zero points for a defeat. There were no draws as the game will go to penalties if the game ends in a draw after 90 mins. Also, each goal contributed a point to the team, regardless of whether the team won or lost.

Matches

Goalscorers

Media coverage

References

External links 

German football friendly trophies
Sport in Dresden
2016–17 in German football
Dresden Cup